Melenie Mahinamalamalama Eleneke (December 25, 1959 – September 9, 2013) was a transgender rights activist of the Transgender, Gender Variant, and Intersex Justice Project (TGIJP) in San Francisco, hula dancer and spiritual healer.

Personal life 
Eleneke was born December 25, 1959, in Honolulu, Hawai’i, the youngest child of Jerett Kalani Eleneke and Alene Ku’ukama’aloha Parker Eleneke-Pa’s five children. Her siblings are Shalei, Wayne, Paul, and Charles Eleneke and Char Thompson. She transitioned while attending Kailua High School in Honolulu, where she graduated in 1977.

She studied Social Justice at San Francisco State University.

Activism 

Eleneke was a long-serving community leader with TGIJP, starting in 2004. Among her different roles were member of the Leadership Team in 2007, director of Development and Administration from 2008-2009 and editor of the prison newsletter, Stiletto, from 2008. As part of her work, she visited trans people at California Medical Facility (CMF) in Vacaville and other prisons. She organized letter-writing events for prisoners in California and throughout the country. She offered workshops on spiritual healing to trans people coming out of prison and jail.

In February 2008, she and Miss Major Griffin-Gracy addressed the UN Committee on the Elimination of Racial Discrimination in Geneva, Switzerland on the lack of economic opportunity for transgender women of color in the United States.

Eleneke was an active member of The Ladies of Keolalaulani Halau and the House of Valenciaga, a founder of a transgender women of color hula group, and a long-time leader in the Asian & Pacific Islander Wellness Center.

References 

1959 births
2013 deaths
San Francisco State University alumni
Transgender women
Hawaiian cultural activists
LGBT people from Hawaii